Joseph Stalin, the second leader of the Soviet Union, died on 5 March 1953.

Death of Stalin may also refer to:
 La Mort de Staline, a two-volume French graphic novel published in 2010 and 2012 by Thierry Robin and Fabien Nury
 The Death of Stalin, a 2017 film by Armando Iannucci, based on the graphic novel